Opposition to the partition of India was widespread in British India in the 20th century and it continues to remain a talking point in South Asian politics. Those who opposed it often adhered to the doctrine of composite nationalism. The Hindu, Christian, Anglo-Indian, Parsi and Sikh communities were largely opposed to the partition of India (and its underlying two-nation theory), as were many Muslims (these were represented by the All India Azad Muslim Conference).

Pashtun politician and Indian independence activist Khan Abdul Ghaffar Khan of the Khudai Khidmatgar viewed the proposal to partition India as un-Islamic and contradicting a common history in which Muslims considered India as their homeland for over a millennium. Mahatma Gandhi opined that "Hindus and Muslims were sons of the same soil of India; they were brothers who therefore must strive to keep India free and united."

Sunni Muslims of the Deobandi school of thought "criticized the idea of Pakistan as being the conspiracy of the colonial government to prevent the emergence of a strong united India" and helped to organize the Azad Muslim Conference to condemn the partition of India. They also argued that the economic development of Muslims would be hurt if India was partitioned, seeing the idea of partition as one that was designed to keep Muslims backward. They also expected "Muslim-majority provinces in united India to be more effective than the rulers of independent Pakistan in helping the Muslim minorities living in Hindu-majority areas." Deobandis pointed to the Treaty of Hudaybiyyah, which was made between the Muslims and Qureysh of Mecca, that "promoted mutual interaction between the two communities thus allowing more opportunities for Muslims to preach their religion to Qureysh through peaceful tabligh." Deobandi Sunni scholar Sayyid Husain Ahmad Madani argued for a united India in his book Muttahida Qaumiyat Aur Islam (Composite Nationalism and Islam), promulgating the idea that different religions do not constitute different nationalities and that the proposition for a partition of India was not justifiable, religiously.

Khaksar Movement leader Allama Mashriqi opposed the partition of India because he felt that if Muslims and Hindus had largely lived peacefully together in India for centuries, they could also do so in a free and united India. Mashriqi saw the two-nation theory as a plot of the British to maintain control of the region more easily, if India was divided into two countries that were pitted against one another. He reasoned that a division of India along religious lines would breed fundamentalism and extremism on both sides of the border. Mashriqi thought that "Muslim majority areas were already under Muslim rule, so if any Muslims wanted to move to these areas, they were free to do so without having to divide the country." To him, separatist leaders "were power hungry and misleading Muslims in order to bolster their own power by serving the British agenda."

In the 1946 Indian provincial elections, only 16% of Indian Muslims, mainly those from upper class, were able to vote. Many lower class Indian Muslims opposed the partition of India, believing that "a Muslim state would benefit only upper-class Muslims."

The All India Conference of Indian Christians, representing the Christians of colonial India, along with Sikh political parties such as the Chief Khalsa Diwan and Shiromani Akali Dal led by Master Tara Singh condemned the call by separatists to create Pakistan, viewing it as a movement that would possibly persecute them.

Critics of the partition of India argue that an undivided India would have boasted one of the strongest armies in the world, had more competitive sports teams, fostered an increased protection of minorities with religious harmony, championed greater women's rights, possessed extended maritime borders, projected elevated soft power, and offered a "focus on education and health instead of the defence sector".

Pakistan was created through the partition of India on the basis of religious segregation; the very concept of dividing the country of India along religious lines has been criticized as being a backward idea for the modern era. After it occurred, critics of the partition of India point to the displacement of fifteen million people, the murder of more than one million people, and the rape of 75,000 women to demonstrate the view that it was a mistake.

Organisations and prominent individuals opposing the partition of India

Political parties 

All India Anglo-Indian Association led by its president Frank Anthony "vociferously opposed Partition".
All India Azad Muslim Conference was an organisation headed by the Premier of Sind Allah Bakhsh Soomro, which represented the religiously observant Muslim working class; in one of the largest gatherings of Muslims in colonial India, it rallied in Delhi to oppose the partition of India.
All India Conference of Indian Christians opposed the partition of India, as well as the creation of separate electorates based on religion; it supported swaraj and helped to secure to rights of minorities in the Constitution of India.
All-India Jamhur Muslim League was erected "in 1940, to oppose Jinnah's scheme of Pakistan".
All India Momin Conference saw itself as articulating the interests of common, rather than upper-class Muslims and passed a resolution against the partition of India in 1940. It said: “the Partition scheme was not only impracticable and unpatriotic but altogether un-Islamic and unnatural, because the geographical position of the different provinces of India and the intermingled population of the Hindus and Muslims are against the proposal and because the two communities have been living together for centuries, and they have many things in common between them.”
All India Muslim Majlis opposed the partition of India "as impracticable". 
All India Shia Political Conference protested the idea of creating a Pakistan, being against the partition of colonial India. It also supported common electorates.
Anjuman-i-Watan Baluchistan allied itself with the Indian National Congress and opposed the partition of India. 
Central Khalsa Young Men Union declared its "unequivocal opposition" to the creation of a separate Muslim state in northwestern India, as with other Sikh organisations.
Chief Khalsa Diwan declared its "unequivocal opposition" to the creation of a separate Muslim state in northwestern India, as with other Sikh organisations.
Communist Party of India opposed the partition of India and did not participate in the Independence Day celebrations of 15 August 1947 in protest of the division of the country.
Hindu Mahasabha opposed the partition of India, The stand taken by Hindu Mahasabha was defined by Vinayak Damodar Savarkar, the President of the Sabha. Hindu Maha Sabha was against the creation of Pakistan and proposed to resist it by all means.
Indian National Congress firmly opposed the partition of India, though it later reluctantly accepted it after the failure of the Cabinet Mission Plan. According to Congress it was unavoidable from India's side.
Jamiat Ahl-i-Hadis was a member party of the All India Azad Muslim Conference, which opposed the partition of India.
Jamiat Ulema-e-Hind was "uncompromisingly against the formation of Pakistan", rejecting the idea of the partition and instead advocating for composite nationalism in a united India (cf. Muttahida Qaumiyat Aur Islam).
Khaksar Movement opposed the partition of India and were "outspoken critics of the Pakistan scheme".
Khudai Khidmatgar stood out against the partition of India, using nonviolent principles to resist British rule in the country.
Krishak Praja Party condemned idea of a partition plan as "absurd and meaningless".
Majlis-e-Ahrar-ul-Islam passed a resolution in 1943 declaring itself to be against the partition and "introduced a sectarian element into its objections by portraying Jinnah as an infidel in an attempt to discredit his reputation."
Sind United Party held that "Whatever our faiths we must live together in our country in an atmosphere of perfect amity and our relations should be the relations of the several brothers of a joint family, various members of which are free to profess their faith as they like without any let or hindrance and of whom enjoy equal benefits of their joint property."
Shiromani Akali Dal led by Master Tara Singh saw the idea of the creation of a Muslim state as inviting possible persecution of Sikhs, who thus "launched a virulent campaign against the Lahore Resolution".
Unionist Party (Punjab), which had a base of Muslims, Hindus and Sikhs, opposed the partition of India from the perspective of seeing the Punjabi identity as more important than one's religious identity.

Politicians 

Abul Kalam Azad stated that the creation of a Pakistan would only benefit upper class Muslims who would come to monopolize the economy of the separate state; he warned that if it would be created, it would be controlled by international powers, "and with the passage of time this control will become tight".
Abdul Matlib Mazumdar supported Hindu-Muslim unity and opposed the partition of India, being a prominent Muslim leader in eastern Hindustan.
Abdul Qayyum Khan, a barrister from the North-West Frontier Province of colonial India, declared that he would resist the partition of India with his own blood; he reversed his position in 1945 and joined the All India Muslim League
Abdul Samad Khan Achakzai argued against the two-nation theory, favouring a united India.
Allah Bakhsh Soomro, the Chief Minister of Sind, was vehemently opposed to partitioning India on the basis of religious lines; he chaired the All India Azad Muslim Conference to advocate for a united and independent India. Allah Bakhsh Soomro proclaimed that the very concept of "The Muslims as a separate nation in India on the basis of their religion, is un-Islamic."
Ansar Harvani, a nationalist Muslim, voted against the resolution to partition India.
Altaf Hussain, a Pakistani politician and founder of the Muttahida Qaumi Movement political party, called the partition of India the "greatest blunder" that resulted in "the division of blood, culture, brotherhood, relationships".
Arshad Madani has criticized the partition of India, stating that it "has become a cause of destruction and ruin, not just for a particular community, but for both Hindus and Muslims."
Fakhruddin Ali Ahmed supported Mahatma Gandhi's vision of a united India.
Fazl-i-Hussain was opposed to the separatist campaign to create a Muslim state through the division of India.
Frank Anthony, president of the All India Anglo-Indian Association, "vociferously opposed Partition".
Ghulam Hussain Hidayatullah, who was elected as the Chief Minister of Sind from 1937–1938 and also 1942–1947, rejected the idea to partition India.
Inayatullah Khan Mashriqi advocated a joint Hindu-Muslim revolution and called everyone to "all rise against" the "conspiracy" of a partition plan.
Kanaiyalal Maneklal Munshi saw the idea of the partition of India as one that catered to the policies of divide and rule by the British government and he thus strongly opposed it, calling for an Akhand Hindustan (Hindi-Urdu for "united India").
Khan Abdul Ghaffar Khan opposed the partition of India and campaigned against British rule in the country through nonviolence.
Khan Abdul Jabbar Khan favoured a united India and was an ally of the Indian National Congress. He stood against communalism and battled the Muslim League after it became apparent that a Pakistan would be created out of the provinces of northwest colonial India.
Khwaja Abdul Majid was a social reformer and lawyer "who supported Gandhi in his opposition to the partition of India."
Khwaja Atiqullah, the brother of the Nawab of Dhaka, "collected 25,000 signatures and submitted a memorandum opposing the partition".
Lal Khan, a Pakistani politician and founder of The Struggle Pakistan, criticized the partition of India and advocated for Indian reunification, which he stated would heal continuing wounds and solve the Kashmir conflict. Advocating for a common revolution, Khan declared that "Five thousand years of common history, culture and society is too strong to be cleavaged by this partition." 
Maghfoor Ahmad Ajazi opposed the partition of India and founded the All-India Jamhur Muslim League to advocate for a united India.
Mahatma Gandhi opposed the partition of India, seeing it as contradicting his vision of unity among Indians of all religions.
Malik Khizar Hayat Tiwana, the Premier of Punjab, opposed the partition of India, seeing it as a ploy to divide the Punjab Province and Punjabi people. He felt that Muslims, Sikhs and Hindus of the Punjab all had a common culture and was against dividing India on the basis of religious segregation. Malik Khizar Hayat Tiwana, himself a Muslim, remarked to the separatist leader Muhammad Ali Jinnah: "There are Hindu and Sikh Tiwanas who are my relatives. I go to their weddings and other ceremonies. How can I possibly regard them as coming from another nation?" March 1 was proclaimed by Tiwana as Communal Harmony Day, with the Communal Harmony Committee being established by him in Lahore, with Raja Narendra Nath as its president and Maulvi Mahomed Ilyas as its secretary.
Maulana Hifzur Rahman, a nationalist Muslim, voted against the resolution to partition India.
Maulana Syed Ata Ullah Shah Bukhari was the creator of the Majlis-e-Ahrar-ul-Islam, which passed a resolution in 1943 declaring itself to be against the partition and "introduced a sectarian element into its objections by portraying Jinnah as an infidel in an attempt to discredit his reputation."
Markandey Katju views the British as bearing responsibility for the partition of India; he regards Jinnah as a British agent who advocated for the creation of Pakistan in order "to satisfy his ambition to become the ‘Quaid-e-Azam’, regardless of the suffering his actions caused to both Hindus and Muslims." Katju claimed that after witnessing Hindus and Muslims joining hands in the First War of Indian Independence in 1857, the British government implemented a divide and rule policy to cause them to fight one another rather than rise up to fight against colonial rule. He also claims that the British government orchestrated the partition of India in order to prevent a united India from emerging as an industrial power that would rival the economy of any western state.
Master Tara Singh declared that his party, the Shiromani Akali Dal would fight "tooth and nail" against the partition of India and creation of Pakistan.
Maulana Mazhar Ali Azhar referred to Jinnah as Kafir-e-Azam ("The Great Kafir"). He, as with other Ahrar leaders, opposed the partition of India.
Maulana Sayyid Husain Ahmad Madani strongly opposed the campaign for a separate Muslim state, instead advocating for composite nationalism in a united India (cf. Muttahida Qaumiyat aur Islam). Five decades earlier, Sayyid Jamal al-Din al-Afghani Asadabadi advocated for the same; he held that Hindu-Muslim unity in India as opposed to unity between Indian Muslims and foreign Muslims, would effectively combat British colonial rule, leading to an independent India.
Maulana Abul Ala Maududi, the founder of Jamaat-e-Islami, actively worked to prevent the partition of India, arguing that concept violated the Islamic doctrine of the ummah. Maulana Maududi saw the partition as creating a temporal border that would divide Muslims from one another. He advocated for the whole of India to be reclaimed for Islam.
M. C. Davar opposed the partition of India, creating the "United Party of India (UPI) with the aim of removing the chasm between the Congress and the Muslim League."
Mohan Bhagwat, the 6th Sarsanghchalak of the Rashtriya Swayamsevak Sangh, declared in November 2021 that "The only solution to the pain of Partition lies in undoing it."
Muhammad Tayyab Danapuri was a Barelwi scholar who wrote against Jinnah in his books. 
Mohammed Abdur Rahiman, a peace activist, "mobilised the Muslim masses against the two-nation theory of Muslim League."
Mufti Mahmud, associated with the Darul Uloom Deoband, opposed the partition of India.
Mukhtar Ahmed Ansari argued against Jinnah's two-nation theory.
Nawabzada Nasrullah Khan, coming from the background with ties to the Indian National Congress and Majlis-e-Ahrar-ul-Islam, opposed the Muslim League.
Purushottam Das Tandon opposed the partition of India, advocating unity, stating that "Acceptance of the resolution will be an abject surrender to the British and the Muslim League. The admission of the Working Committee was an admission of weakness and the result of a sense of despair. The Partition would not benefit either community – the Hindus in Pakistan and the Muslims in India would both live in fear."
Rafi Ahmed Kidwai supported Mahatma Gandhi's vision of a united India.
Saifuddin Kitchlew, a Kashmiri Muslim leader and President of the Punjab Provincial Congress Committee, was strongly opposed to the partition of India, calling it "a surrender of nationalism in favour of communalism". Kitchlew was an Indian nationalist who opposed British colonial rule and held "that a divided India would only debilitate the Muslim cause, in terms of its political emancipation and economic prosperity."
Salman Khurshid criticized the partition of India, opining that a united India with a liberal democracy and proportional representation would have been better for the Muslims of the Indian subcontinent. Khurshid praised Nelson Mandela for refusing to accept a partition of South Africa.
Shaukatullah Shah Ansari argued against Jinnah's two-nation theory.
Sheikh Abdullah supported Mahatma Gandhi's vision of a united India.
Shibli Nomani argued against Jinnah's two-nation theory.
Sikandar Hayat Khan, the Prime Minister of Punjab, was opposed to the partition of India as he saw the consequence of dividing the Punjab as painful.
Syed Sultan Ahmed backed M. C. Davar in his opposition to the partition of India.
Syed Mohammad Sharfuddin Quadri, a leader who joined the Indian independence movement at the time of the Salt March, opposed the two-nation theory and was imprisoned in the same jail cell as Mahatma Gandhi
Syed Habib-ul-Rahman of the Krishak Praja Party said that partitioning India was "absurd" and "chimerical". Criticising the partition of the province of Bengal and India as a whole, Syed Habib-ul-Rahman said that "the Indian, both Hindus and Muslims, live in a common motherland, use the offshoots of a common language and literature, and are proud of the noble heritage of a common Hindu and Muslim culture, developed through centuries of residence in a common land".
Tarun Vijay, a member of the Rajya Sabha aligned with the Rashtriya Swayamsevak Sangh, is critical of the partition of India, faulting the British for it, and advocates for Indian reunification due to the “same cultural thread” that he states runs throughout the subcontinent. Vijay believes that nature has established one contiguous entity known as Hindustan or Bharat has exited throughout history and that in his travels to Pakistan and Bangladesh, the people there expressed a “close affinity with Indians”.  Vijay praised Abraham Lincoln for refusing to accept separatist tendencies in the United States during the time of the American Civil War.
Ted Grant, founder of the International Marxist Tendency, heavily criticized the partition of India, calling it "a crime carried out by British Imperialism" that was done in order "to divide the subcontinent to make it easier to control from outside once they had been forced to abandon a military presence." 
Tikka Raja Shatrujit Singh of Kapurthala stated his opposition to the partition of India and advocates for Indian reunification, citing the communal harmony that existed in the Kapurthala State of colonial India, which contained Sikhs, Muslims and Hindus who lived peacefully. According to him, a secular and united India would have been a global superpower.
Ubaidullah Sindhi organised a conference in 1940 in Kumbakonam to stand against the separatist campaign to create Pakistan, stating "if such schemes were considered realistically, it would be apparent at once how damaging they would be not only for Indian Muslims but for the whole Islamic world."
Vinayak Damodar Savarkar opposed the partition of India, although saw that there are two nations in India —one the Muslim nation and the other the Hindu nation.
Zahid Ali Khan opposed the partition of India, believing that it would divide the Muslims of the Indian subcontinent.
Zakir Hussain supported Mahatma Gandhi's vision of a united India.

Military officers 
 was awarded for at least three years of service in the
Indian Army between 3 September 1939 and 2 September
1945.]]
Nathu Singh, an officer of the British Indian Army who opposed the partition of India, felt that the British decided to deliberately divide India in order to weaken it in hopes that Indians would ask the British to lengthen their rule in India. Singh said that the armed forces of undivided India were not affected by the "virus of communalism" and "were capable of holding the country together and thereby avoiding Partition." Singh was unable to forgive the politicians for failing to consult with the Indian Army before accepting the partition of India.

Historians and other academics 

Alain Daniélou, a French historian, saw the partition of India as a "great mistake" both "on the human level as well as on the political one". Daniélou stated that it "burdened India" and added to the region Pakistan, which he called an "unstable state". He said that as a result of the division of India, "India whose ancient borders stretched until Afghanistan, lost with the country of seven rivers (the Indus Valley), the historical centre of her civilisation." 
Rajmohan Gandhi, at the Oxford Union, stated in 2018 that “To welcome Partition is to imply that people with different backgrounds and different blood-lines cannot live together in one nation. A regressive suggestion.” Gandhi opined that "The corollary that those possessing a common religion or common race enjoy blissful companionship in their homes, nations or regions is, well, hilarious." He holds that "tyranny was multiplied by partition".
Maulvi Syed Tufail Ahmad Manglori, Indian educationalist and historian, opposed the partition of India and campaigned against the idea of separate electorates based on religion. He authored Rooh-e-Raushan Mustaqbil (روح روشن مستقبل), which argued against the Pakistan separatist movement.
Arvind Sharma, Professor of Comparative Religion at McGill University,  along with Harvey Cox (Professor of Divinity at Harvard University), Manzoor Ahmad (Professor at Concordia University) and Rajendra Singh (Professor of Linguistics at the Université de Montréal), has stated that the malaise and sectarian violence within South Asia is a consequence of the partition of India, which took place without a referendum in pre-1947 colonial India; these professors have stated that "Inhabitants of the subcontinent of India are poignantly reminded at this moment of the grave injustice that was done to them in 1947, when British India was partitioned without taking the wishes of its inhabitants into account." Sharma, Cox, Ahmad and Singh further wrote that "We regret that the fate of a quarter of the population of the globe was decided arbitrarily by the representative of an imperial power and by those who were not even duly elected by adult franchise." As such, Sharma, Cox, Ahmad and Singh in The New York Times in 1992 demanded that "a plebiscite be held over the entire territory that comprised British India on the question of its partition into India and Pakistan."

Scientists 
Pervez Hoodbhoy criticized the partition of India, calling it an "unspeakable tragedy" that "separated people who at one time could live together in peace".

Writers 
Ashis Ray, president of the Indian Journalists' Association, criticized the partition of India at a debate organized by the Oxford Union in 2018, holding that Hindus and Muslims could have lived together peacefully in a united India.
Hasrat Mohani, an Urdu poet who coined the Hindustani language phrase Inquilab Zindabad (translation: "Long live the revolution!") was against the two-nation theory and chose to remain in independent India after the partition occurred.
Jaun Elia opposed the partition of India due to his Communist ideology, remembering his birth city Amroha with nostalgia after he moved to Karachi. Elia said that the formation of Pakistan was a prank played on the people by elites from Aligarh.
M. Alexeyev, writing in the Bolshevik less than one year after the partition of India occurred, stated:

Saadat Hasan Manto strongly opposed the partition of India, which he saw as an "overwhelming tragedy" and "maddeningly senseless". The literature he is remembered for is largely about the partition of India.
Sri Aurobindo, a poet, saw the partition of India as a "monstrosity" and on 15 August 1947, stated that he hoped "the Nation will not accept the settled fact as for ever settled, or as anything more than a temporary expedient." He further said that "if it lasts, India may be seriously weakened, even crippled; civil strife may remain always possible, possible even a new invasion and foreign conquest. The partition of the country must go...For without it the destiny of India might be seriously impaired and frustrated. That must not be." Aurobindo saw the two-nation theory as "new-fanged", "contrary to the facts" and being "invented by Jinnah for his purposes"; Aurobindo wrote that "More than 90% of the Indian Muslims are descendants of converted Hindus and belong as much to the Indian nation as the Hindu themselves. Jinnah is himself a descendant of a Hindu named Jinnahbhai" (cf. Jinnah family.
Tarek Fatah, a Pakistani Canadian author and journalist, has criticized the partition of India, calling the division of the country "tragic" and lamenting that his homeland of Punjab "was sliced in two by the departing British to create the new state of Pakistan." He states that the British government partitioned India so that they would be able to combat Soviet influence through the establishment of British military installations in what was then northwestern colonial India (now Pakistan).

Religious leaders and organizations 
All India Conference of Indian Christians opposed the partition of India, as well as the creation of separate electorates based on religion; it supported swaraj and helped to secure to rights of minorities in the Constitution of India.
Darul Uloom Deoband continues to oppose the two-nation theory, instead advocating for composite nationalism and a united India.
Jamaat-e-Islami actively worked to prevent the partition of India, with its leader Maulana Abul A'la Maududi arguing that concept violated the Islamic doctrine of the ummah. The Jamaat-e-Islami saw the partition as creating a temporal border that would divide Muslims from one another.
Mohammad Sajjad "played a stellar role in ideologically countering the Muslim League and Muhammad Ali Jinnah’s demand for Pakistan, besides campaigning vigorously on the plank of composite nationalism."
Zakir Naik criticized the partition of India and creation of Pakistan, calling it a tragedy. Naik holds that those who advocated the creation of Pakistan out of the northwestern provinces of colonial India were "not even practising Muslims".

Indian Reunification proposals 

The subject of undoing the partition and reunifying India has been discussed by both Indians and Pakistanis. In  The Nation, Kashmiri Indian politician Markandey Katju has advocated the reunification of India with Pakistan under a secular government. He stated that the cause of the partition was the divide and rule policy of Britain, which was implemented to spread communal hatred after Britain saw that Hindus and Muslims worked together to agitate against their colonial rule in India. Katju serves as the chairman of the Indian Reunification Association (IRA), which seeks to campaign for this cause.

Pakistani historian Nasim Yousaf, the grandson of Allama Mashriqi, has also championed Indian Reunification and presented the idea at the New York Conference on Asian Studies on 9 October 2009 at Cornell University; Yousaf stated that the partition of India itself was a result of the divide and rule policies of the British government that sought to create another buffer state between the Soviet Union and India to prevent the spread of Communism, as well the fact that a "division of the people and territory would prevent a united India from emerging as a world power and keep the two nations dependent on pivotal powers." Yousaf cited former Indian National Congress president Maulana Abul Kalam Azad, who wrote in the same vein:

Yousaf holds that "Muhammad Ali Jinnah, the President of the All-India Muslim League and later founder of Pakistan, had been misleading the Muslim community in order to go down in history as the saviour of the Muslim cause and to become founder and first Governor General of Pakistan." Allama Mashriqi, a nationalist Muslim, thus saw Jinnah as "becoming a tool in British hands for his political career." Besides the pro-separatist Muslim League, Islamic leadership in British India rejected the notion of partitioning the country, exemplified by the fact that most Muslims in the heartland of the subcontinent remained where they were, rather than migrating to newly created state of Pakistan. India and Pakistan are currently allocating a significant amount of their budget into military spending—money that could be spent in economic and social development. Poverty, homelessness, illiteracy, terrorism and a lack of medical facilities, in Yousaf's eyes, would not be plaguing an undivided India as it would be more advantaged "economically, politically, and socially." Yousaf has stated that Indians and Pakistanis speak a common lingua franca, Hindustani, "wear the same dress, eat the same food, enjoy the same music and movies, and communicate in the same style and on a similar wavelength". He argues that uniting would be a challenge, though not impossible, citing the fall of the Berlin Wall and the consequent German Reunification as an example.

French journalist François Gautier and Pakistani politician Lal Khan have expressed the view that Indian reunification would solve the conflict in the region of Jammu & Kashmir.

See also 
Madani–Iqbal debate
Aaj Himalay Ki Choti Se
Composite Nationalism and Islam
Gandhism
Hindu–Muslim unity
Hindustan
Indian independence movement
Indian nationalism
Malerkotla
Violence against women during the partition of India

References

Cited sources

External links 
The tragedy of Partition – Deccan Herald 
Facts Don't Back The Argument That Most Indian Muslims Wanted Partition by Rupa Subramanya – The Huffington Post
Gandhi opposed Partition by Mohammed Ayoob – The Hindu
At Oxford, a stereotype on Partition is busted – The Telegraph
 Muslim League Attack on Sikhs and Hindus in the Punjab 1947 – Shiromani Gurdwara Parbandhak Committee

Ethnic cleansing in Asia
Forced migration
History of the Republic of India
Partition (politics)
1947 in British India
Partition of India